Robert Lee Massey (born February 17, 1966) is a former American football coach and former player. He is the head football coach at Winston-Salem State University in Winston-Salem, North Carolina. Massey played professionally as a cornerback for five teams in the National Football League (NFL) from 1989 to 1997. Pro Football Hall of Fame wide receiver Michael Irvin described Massey as the toughest cornerback he faced during his career. Massey was selected to the Pro Bowl in 1992.  He played college football at North Carolina Central University in Durham, North Carolina. Massey served as the interim head football coach at Livingstone College in Salisbury, North Carolina from 2005 to 2006 and as the head football coach Shaw University in Raleigh, North Carolina from 2012 to 2015. He was fired from his position at Shaw on December 10, 2015.

Head coaching record

College

References

External links
 Winston-Salem State profile
 

1966 births
Living people
American football cornerbacks
Detroit Lions players
Jacksonville Jaguars players
Livingstone Blue Bears football coaches
New Orleans Saints players
New York Giants coaches
New York Giants players
North Carolina Central Eagles football coaches
North Carolina Central Eagles football players
Phoenix Cardinals players
Shaw Bears football coaches
Winston-Salem State Rams football players
High school football coaches in North Carolina
National Conference Pro Bowl players
People from Rock Hill, South Carolina
Coaches of American football from North Carolina
Players of American football from Charlotte, North Carolina
African-American coaches of American football
African-American players of American football
20th-century African-American sportspeople
21st-century African-American sportspeople